David Zoubek (born 3 February 1974) is a retired Czech football midfielder.

References

External links
 
  
 David Zoubek: We imitated football stars 
 
 

1974 births
Living people
Czech footballers
Association football midfielders
Czech expatriate footballers
Expatriate footballers in Finland
Expatriate footballers in Belarus
Czech expatriate sportspeople in Finland
Czech expatriate sportspeople in Belarus
FC Hradec Králové players
Bohemians 1905 players
FC Jokerit players
FC Dinamo Minsk players
FK Bohemians Prague (Střížkov) players
SK Kladno players
Czech First League players
Veikkausliiga players
Belarusian Premier League players
Footballers from Prague